General elections were held in Monaco on 3 February 2008. The Union for Monaco was re-elected, though with a reduced margin of victory.

Results

By party

References

Elections in Monaco
Monaco
Parliamentary election
February 2008 events in Europe